Alexis Enrique García Vega (born 21 July 1960) is a Colombian retired football midfielder. He is currently the manager of La Equidad in the Categoría Primera A.

Club career
Along with seven more siblings, he grew up in barrio La Floresta of Medellín where he started his career playing for the Antioquia Football Selection. In 1980, he joined Once Caldas of Manizales and the same year he was called to play for the Colombia Olympic football team for the Moscow Olympic Games. In 1987, he joined Atlético Nacional of Medellín where he remained until his retirement in 1998. Known as "The Great Captain", Alexis Garcia was considered one of the Colombia's best midfielders and a crowd's favorite in a time when the Colombian football was starting to shine at the international level. In 1989 Garcia led Atlético Nacional to become Copa Libertadores champions.  In 1988 Garcia debuted with the senior Colombia national football team against Canada, a game that the Colombians won 3–0. Because of misunderstandings with national team coach Francisco Maturana Alexis Garcia missed the 1990 FIFA World Cup in Italy. His last game for the Colombia national team was in August 1993 against Paraguay. Garcia played a total of 25 games for Colombia and scored a total of 2 goals.

International career
García made 24 appearances for the senior Colombia national football team from 1988 to 1993, including participating in the 1993 Copa América.

He also played for Colombia at the 1980 Olympic Games in Moscow.

Honours

Player
Atlético Nacional
Categoría Primera A (2): 1991, 1994
Copa Libertadores (1): 1989

Manager
La Equidad
Categoria Primera B (1): 2006
Copa Colombia (1): 2008

References

1960 births
Living people
People from Quibdó
Colombian footballers
Colombia international footballers
Footballers at the 1980 Summer Olympics
Olympic footballers of Colombia
Once Caldas footballers
Atlético Nacional footballers
Categoría Primera A players
1989 Copa América players
1991 Copa América players
1993 Copa América players
Copa Libertadores-winning players
Colombian football managers
Once Caldas managers
Atlético Nacional managers
Atlético Junior managers
Deportivo Pereira managers
Association football midfielders
Sportspeople from Chocó Department
La Equidad managers
Deportivo Pasto managers